In American football, jammers are a specialized type of cornerback. Their task is to try to slow down gunners during punts by preventing them from getting a free release, giving punt returners more time to return punts. A jammer is typically played by a back-up for another position. The term "jammer" is seldom used.

References

American football positions